Schnauder Island is an uninhabited island of the Greenland Sea, Greenland. 

This island was named after German astronomer Max Schnauder (1860-1939) by the ill-fated Denmark Expedition.

Geography
Schnauder Island lies in the northern Jokel Bay area by the terminus of the Zachariae Isstrom glacier. The Achton Friis Islands lie off the northern end and the Franske Islands to the east. It has a surface of 180.3 km2 and a shoreline of 105 kilometres.

See also
List of islands of Greenland

References

Uninhabited islands of Greenland